Antoine Lefèvre (born 18 February 1966) is a French politician and a member of the Senate of France. He represents the Aisne department and is a member of the Union for a Popular Movement Party.

References
Page on the Senate website

1966 births
Living people
French Senators of the Fifth Republic
Union for a Popular Movement politicians
Senators of Aisne
Politicians from Düsseldorf
The Republicans (France) politicians
Mayors of places in Hauts-de-France